= Wilhelmina Woyka =

British temperance activist (fl. 1849 – 1890)

Wilhelmina Woyka (née Elvin, fl. 1849 – 1890) was a British temperance activist.

She was born Wilhemina Johanna Henrietta Elvin, the daughter of Dr John Elvin, who was sent as a medical missionary to the Jews of Hamburg by the Scottish Free Church. In 1849 she became engaged to Johann Woyka, a Hungarian Baptist missionary who had fled to Hamburg during the Hungarian Revolution. They were married in 1850 and returned to Scotland that year with Wilhelmina’s parents. In Glasgow, Johann (anglicised to John) became a Baptist minister and timber exporter, and Wilhelmina became active in the Glaswegian temperance community.

About 1874, Wilhelmina was one of the founding members of the Ladies’ Temperance Prayer Union, later the Glasgow Prayer Union. They established the Whitevale Mission Shelter, an inebriate house for the education of women struggling with alcohol abuse. Wilhelmina would walk the streets of Glasgow at midnight in search of inebriated women, or invite women prisoners to the house on a 'Free Breakfast' scheme on the day of their release from prison. She was still active in 1890, where she spoke on the subject of temperance in over a dozen cities.
